Joel Daniel Phillips is an American artist best known for his realist life-size portraits, particularly of San Francisco, California residents that highlight disenfranchised segments of the population.

Early life
Phillips was born July 25, 1989, and grew up in Redmond, Washington. He received a BFA from Westmont College in Santa Barbara, California, in 2011,  and worked as a graphic designer before finding his first fine art representation and becoming a full-time fine artist.

Career

Early Work
Between 2011 and 2017 Phillips drew more than 100 life-size portraits of his neighbors in San Francisco. For Phillips, the focus on fringe populations represented “a visual record of my striving to recognize unknown and unnoticed individuals through the tip of my pencil.”

Phillips was the third-place winner of the  Smithsonian National Portrait Gallery’s Outwin Boochever Portrait Competition in 2016.  The winning portrait titled “Eugene #4” was of a gentleman he met on the corner of Sixth and Mission Streets in San Francisco, where Phillips lived from 2011-2016.

Later Work
In 2017, Phillips moved to Tulsa, Oklahoma to participate in the Tulsa Artist Fellowship. With this move, Phillips' work expanded to explore questions behind how and why the neighborhoods his portraits came from became what they are today. These works, depicting a range of historical material, are “a conscious re-examination of artistic culpability, historic ownership, and the hollowness of Western romanticization” and have been described as “seductive and terrifying."

In 2020 Phillips received an Artist Integration Grant from the Tulsa Artist Fellowship to commission a series of poems in response to his "Killing the Negative" drawings. This grant enabled the project to expand from a series of drawings and paintings by Phillips to include prose responses by some of the leading voices in contemporary American poetry, including noted poet, historian and educator Quraysh Ali Lansana, U.S. Poet Laureate Joy Harjo, North Carolina Poet Laureate Jaki Shelton Green and others. The works are a response to a subset of the Farm Security Administration’s (FSA) foundational commissioned photographs of the Great Depression. These images are of course, well known, and images like “Migrant Mother” by Dorothea Lange have become some of the most recognizable and important images in the American photographic lexicon. Less known, however, is the process by which these images were selected for publication: Roy Stryker was the head of the FSA, and for the first 4 years of the project, images he deemed unworthy were “killed” by punching a hole in the original negative. 

These collaborative works have been the subject of gallery exhibitions in New York City, Los Angeles and Oslo, Norway. The project has been received to significant acclaim, and works from this series have been acquired by the Crocker Art Museum, Philbrook Museum of Art and 21c Museum Hotels. Left Field Books will be publishing a complete catalogue of the poems and visual works in 2023.

Exhibitions
Phillips’ work has been exhibited at galleries and institutions around the world, including the  Smithsonian National Portrait Gallery, Tacoma Art Museum, The Art Museum of South Texas, Fort Wayne Museum of Art,  Mesa Contemporary Arts Center, Ackland Art Museum, Gilcrease Museum and the Philbrook Museum of Art. His work can be found in the public collections at the Denver Art Museum, Gilcrease Museum, West Collection and the Fort Wayne Museum of Art. Phillips' work has been selected for the Outwin Boochever Portrait Competition at the  Smithsonian National Portrait Gallery for the past three concurrent exhibitions (2016, 2019 and 2022), at which he received 3rd prize in 2016 and Honorable Mention in 2022.

In 2019 Phillips had his first solo museum exhibitions with a show at Philbrook Museum of Art in February and a show at the Fort Wayne Museum of Art in March.

Public Collections
 Smithsonian National Portrait Gallery
 Denver Art Museum
 Philbrook Museum of Art
 Ackland Art Museum
 Crocker Art Museum
 21c Museum Hotels
 Gilcrease Museum
 Fort Wayne Museum of Art
 West Collection

External links
 Joel Daniel Phillips' Website

References

Artists from San Francisco
1989 births
Living people